Magnus Knutsson (born 12 March 1963) is a Swedish former cyclist. He competed in the team time trial event at the 1984 Summer Olympics.

References

External links
 

1963 births
Living people
Swedish male cyclists
Olympic cyclists of Sweden
Cyclists at the 1984 Summer Olympics
Sportspeople from Västra Götaland County